Dimitri (Dmitry Yulonovich Gruzinsky; 11 April 1803 – 14 January 1845) was a Georgian prince (batonishvili) of the House of Bagrationi, the youngest son of Prince Iulon of Georgia and his wife, Princess Salome née Amilakhvari.

Family
Dimitri was born in the former royal house of Georgia already after the Russian annexation of his country. His father, Iulon, was a son of Heraclius II, the penultimate king of Kartli and Kakheti (eastern Georgia) and a pretender to the throne of Georgia. In 1805, Iulon and his family, with the exception of Dimitri's rebellious elder brother Leon, were deported by the Russian authorities to Tula. Later, they were allowed to settle in St. Petersburg, the imperial capital.

Political activity
In the 1820s, Dimitri and his cousin Prince Okropir, son of George XII of Georgia, became principal leaders of Georgian royalists, respectively, in St. Petersburg and Moscow. They held gatherings of Georgian students and officers in the Russian cities and tried to convince them that Georgia should be independent under the Bagrationi dynasty. In 1826, Dimitri helped found a secret society, which conceived the idea of an anti-Russian insurrection of Georgia. The most active center of the conspirators, based in the Georgian capital of Tiflis—in which Dimitri's elder sister Tamar, Maid of Honor to the empress, played a role—was betrayed by one of its numbers, Prince Iase Palavandishvili, in 1832. The plot collapsed and Dimitri was deprived of his title of tsarevich ("prince royal") and sent in exile to Smolensk. Afterwards, he grudgingly entered the Russian civil service, attaining to a minor rank of Collegiate Registrar (Коллежский регистратор). On 6 May 1833, he was recognized by the Russian crown in the princely title of knyaz Gruzinsky. He died unmarried, without issue, in 1845 in St. Petersburg and was interred at the Alexander Nevsky Lavra.

Ancestry

References

1803 births
1845 deaths
Bagrationi dynasty of the Kingdom of Kartli-Kakheti
19th-century people from Georgia (country)
People from the Russian Empire of Georgian descent